Lawrence County High School is a public high school located in Monticello, Mississippi, United States.

General information
Lawrence County High School is part of the Lawrence County School District and serves students in grades 9-12.
Located in Monticello, Mississippi, Lawrence County High School serves approximately 650 students.
According to the Mississippi Department of Education's 2010 Accountability Results, Lawrence County High School has an 80.5% graduation rate.
Lawrence County High School is under the direction of principal Tawanna Thorton.

Athletics
Lawrence County High School's Athletic Director and Head Coach of the LCHS Cougar Football team is Mike Davis.
The Lawrence County High School mascot is the Cougar.

Leading the Cougar Boys' Basketball team to two state championships, Miami Heat's Erick Dampier is a graduate of Lawrence County High School.
In 2008, Patrick Sutton, then a student at Lawrence County High School, won the silver medal in the International Powerlifting Federation's Men's Sub-Junior category in Potchefstroom, South Africa.

References

External links
 
Lawrence County School District

Schools in Lawrence County, Mississippi
Public high schools in Mississippi